The 1908 Paris–Tours was the fifth edition of the Paris–Tours cycle race and was held on 27 September 1908. The race started in Paris and finished in Tours. The race was won by Omer Beaugendre.

General classification

References

1908 in French sport
1908